Gershon Yusuf is a Nigerian cricketer. In October 2019, he was named in Nigeria's squad for the 2019 ICC T20 World Cup Qualifier tournament in the United Arab Emirates. He made his Twenty20 International (T20I) debut for Nigeria, against Hong Kong, on 27 October 2019.

References

External links
 

Year of birth missing (living people)
Living people
Nigerian cricketers
Nigeria Twenty20 International cricketers
Place of birth missing (living people)